Jan Balej (born May 30, 1958 in Prague) is an animation artist, film director and art designer from Czech Republic. Balej graduated from the Academy of Art and Industrial Design (UMPRUM) (Studio of Film and Television Graphics) in 1992.

Works 
1992–1994 – Tom Thumb
1999–2000 – bedtime stories for Czech TV 
2000 – short film Džin
2003 – short film Shells 
2006 – One Night in A City feature animated puppet film  
2006 – Fimfarum 2 (the short: The Sea, Uncle, why is it salty?) – Fimfarum 2 was awarded the Czech Lion in 2006
2006 – Mr. Fin and Mr. Twig 
2007 – The Head of a Studio of Animation and TV graphic of Academy of Arts, Architecture and Design in Prague 
2008 – Karlik and Magic Fish – TV series with Czech Television 
2015 – Little from the Fish Shop – feature animated film based on "The Little Mermaid" by Hans Christian Andersen

References 

1958 births
Living people
Film directors from Prague
Czech animators
Czech animated film directors